Workin' Overtime is the eighteenth studio album by American singer Diana Ross, released on June 6, 1989, by Motown Records. Her first Motown album with new material since To Love Again (1981) after a short stint with RCA Records, Ross reunited with frequent collaborator Nile Rodgers, chief producer of her most successful album to date Diana (1980), to make this album which was an attempt to gear her to a much younger audience bringing in new jack swing productions and house music.

Upon its release, Workin' Overtime received negative reviews from music critics and failed commercially despite the title track reaching number three on the Billboard Hot R&B/Hip-Hop Songs. The album reached the top thirty in Sweden and the United Kingdom and peaked at number 116 on the US Billboard 200, earning the distinction of becoming the lowest-charting studio album of Ross' entire solo career. Additional singles "This House" and "Bottom Line" were issued, as well as a Shep Pettibone remix of "Paradise", but all failed to revive the album's sales. The album was supported by a concert tour, the Workin' Overtime World Tour.

Background
Following the release of her album Red Hot Rhythm & Blues (1987), Ross gave birth to her son Ross and became pregnant with Evan, which caused her to go on a hiatus from work. "I stayed off work for about a year... I was having my babies, and during that time I spent a lot of time watching BET on television, the kids doing the hip-hop and so on... and, you know, I’m a risk taker," Ross said.

Workin' Overtime marked Ross' first Motown album with new material since To Love Again (1981), after Ross left the label for a then record breaking $20 million deal with RCA. Upon Diana's return to the label, Motown founder Berry Gordy, Jr. had sold the label to MCA Records and had positioned Jheryl Busby to the head of Motown. Ross was at first reluctant to return to her old label but Gordy promised her a lot in her return: Not only would Ross return to Motown as a recording act, but she would be the label's part-owner.

Critical reception

AllMusic editor Ron Wynn wrote that "this album was the first product of that new contract, and the results weren't very encouraging. There were no moderate or even small hits, and the album quickly dropped off both the R&B and pop charts within a couple of weeks of its release. Ross sounded completely lost, and the production, arrangements, and compositions sounded weak and thin next to the dominant New Jack and hip-hop works."

Track listing
All songs produced by Nile Rodgers.

Credits and personnel
Credits adapted from the album's liner notes.

Performers

Diana Ross – vocals, executive producer
Christopher Max – backing vocals, synth programming
Curtis King – backing vocals
Dennis Collins – backing vocals
Fonzi Thornton – backing vocals
Lazet Michaels – backing vocals
Peggy Taft – backing vocals
Nile Rodgers – producer
Andres Levin – synth programming
Greg Smith – synth programming, mixing
Richard Hilton – synth programming, engineer

Design

Herb Ritts – photography
Sue Reilly – art direction, design

Production

Budd Tunick – coordinator
Rene Bell – coordinator
Tom Durack – engineer, mixing
Keith Freedman – engineer, mixing
Patrick Dillett – engineer
David Michael Dill – engineer
Paul Wertheimer – engineer
Ed Brooks – engineer
Karen Bohanon – engineer
Katherine Miller – engineer
Paul Angelli – engineer
Bob Ludwig – mastering
Frank Cardello – mixing

Charts

Certifications

References

External links

1989 albums
Diana Ross albums
Motown albums
New jack swing albums
Albums produced by Nile Rodgers